Hickey's Almshouses are almshouses between Sheen Road and St Mary's Grove in Richmond, London. 

A plaque over the entrance records that the almshouses were built "for Ten poor Men and Ten poor Women by the bounty of William Hickey Esq. Who by his Will bequeathed certain Lands and houses in Richmond in Trust for Charitable purposes".
William Hickey, who died in 1727 and is buried in an altar tomb in the churchyard of St Mary Magdalene, Richmond, left the income of several properties on Richmond Hill, including The Wick, in trust  to provide pensions for six men and ten women. In 1822 the charity's funds were boosted by a major donation by Elizabeth Doughty.

Twenty almshouses, designed by Lewis Vulliamy,  in Neo-Tudor style with high chimneys, were built in 1834 from the trust's income. These  are Grade II* listed  and Historic England's listing also extends to the site's chapel (which is dedicated to St Francis), also built in 1834 and its two gate lodges.  A later block of almshouses, built in 1851 in the same style as the main quadrangle, is listed at Grade II.

The property, which includes another 29 buildings behind the almshouses, now consists of 49 flats and cottages, a laundry and a workshop.

The almshouses are managed by The Richmond Charities. New residents are accepted from 65 years of age.

Chapel of St Francis
The chapel, which was enlarged in 1863 by Arthur Blomfield, is dedicated to St Francis of Assisi. It includes a memorial tablet, dated 1874, that commemorates William Hickey.

See also
List of almshouses in the United Kingdom

Note

References

External links
The Richmond Charities
The Richmond Charities: Hickey's Almshouses
The National Archives (UK): Will of William Hickey, Gentleman of Richmond, Surrey
The National Archives (UK): Chapel of St Francis, Hickey's Almshouses, Richmond

Further reading

1834 establishments in England
Almshouses in Richmond, London
Arthur Blomfield buildings
Chapels in London
Churches completed in 1834
Churches in the London Borough of Richmond upon Thames
Francis of Assisi
Grade II* listed almshouses
Grade II* listed churches in London
Grade II* listed houses in London
Houses in the London Borough of Richmond upon Thames
Lewis Vulliamy buildings
Residential buildings completed in 1834
Tudor Revival architecture in England